Chatham This Week is a community newspaper serving the city of Chatham, Ontario with a controlled circulation to approximately 19,400 homes.

History

A tabloid, Chatham This Week was launched in February 1991. Dean Mulharrem has been the publisher since April 2005, while Peter Epp has been the editor since July 1996.

See also
List of newspapers in Canada

External links
 The Chatham This Week Official Website
 

Postmedia Network publications
Weekly newspapers published in Ontario
Mass media in Chatham-Kent
Publications established in 1991
1991 establishments in Ontario